Cesar P. Garcia, Jr. is the former Director-General of the National Intelligence Coordinating Agency of the Republic of the Philippines. He is a graduate of the Philippine Military Academy class of 1970.

On 20 August 2008, Garcia resigned due to arthritis, and was succeeded by Major General Pedro Cabuay.

However, on 9 July 2010, President Benigno Aquino III appointed him as National Security Adviser.

References

Living people
Directors of intelligence agencies
Filipino generals
Filipino military personnel
Filipino Roman Catholics
National Security Advisers of the Philippines
Philippine Military Academy alumni
Benigno Aquino III administration cabinet members
Heads of government agencies of the Philippines
Year of birth missing (living people)